Ian McNeice (born 2 October 1950) is an English film and television actor. He found fame portraying government agent Harcourt in the 1985 television series Edge of Darkness, and went on to feature in popular films such as The Englishman Who Went Up a Hill But Came Down a Mountain, Ace Ventura: When Nature Calls and Frank Herbert's Dune.

He played the Newsreader in historical drama Rome (2005–2007) and Bert Large in the comedy drama series Doc Martin (2004–2022).

Early life and education
McNeice was born in Basingstoke, Hampshire. His acting training started at the Taunton School in Somerset, followed by the London Academy of Music and Dramatic Art (LAMDA) and two years at the Salisbury Playhouse. The next few years were spent in theatre, including a four-year period with the Royal Shakespeare Company and a production of Nicholas Nickleby on Broadway.

Career
McNeice's television breakthrough was as Harcourt in the award-winning series Edge of Darkness. He played the alcoholic sous chef Gustave LaRoche on the television series Chef!, and went on to appear in the 2000 miniseries Frank Herbert's Dune as the evil Baron Vladimir Harkonnen, a role he later reprised for the 2003 sequel Children of Dune. His television appearances have included all ten series of Doc Martin, in which he plays Bert Large, series 4 episode 4 of Midsomer Murders, and the third episode of the second series of Lewis. He appears as the Newsreader in the HBO/BBC production Rome and as the Mr. Tapling of the British diplomatic service in Hornblower - The Examination for Lieutenant.

McNeice has also appeared in a number of films, including 84 Charing Cross Road, Day of the Dead, No Escape, From Hell and The Englishman Who Went Up a Hill But Came Down a Mountain. His breakthrough into American films occurred when he played Fulton Greenwall in Ace Ventura: When Nature Calls (1995). He played the Nazi Gerhard Klopfer in the 2001 BBC/HBO television film Conspiracy. 

Since then, he has been in Around the World in 80 Days (2004) and the 2005 supernatural thriller White Noise. He also appeared as Potiphar in Joseph and the Amazing Technicolor Dreamcoat.

McNeice gave his distinctive voice and accent to voice-acting roles like the Vogon character Kwaltz, director of the Vogon Constructor Fleet, in the 2005 film adaptation of Douglas Adams' The Hitchhiker's Guide to the Galaxy. In 2007, he made his Doctor Who debut when he guest-starred as villain Zeus in the Big Finish BBC Digital Radio 7 drama Immortal Beloved. He had a cameo role as Joachim von Kortzfleisch, a German general who refused to put his troops under the command of officers plotting to depose Hitler's government, in Valkyrie.

McNeice was initially cast in the role of Illyrio Mopatis in the HBO pilot of Game of Thrones, but because of scheduling conflicts the role was then given to Roger Allam. McNeice appeared as Winston Churchill in four episodes of Doctor Who in 2010 and 2011; he had previously played Churchill in the 2008 premiere production of the Howard Brenton play Never So Good, and later played him again in the 2012 stage version of The King's Speech.

McNeice also starred as The Architect in the 2017 independent feature film, The House of Screaming Death.

Personal life
McNeice has three children.

Selected filmography

References

External links

1950 births
Living people
English male film actors
English male television actors
English male voice actors
Male actors from Hampshire
People educated at Taunton School
People from Basingstoke
Royal Shakespeare Company members